Ebrahim Rezaei Babadi (born 1955 in Abadan) is an Iranian politician, and the president of Touring & Automobile Club of the Islamic Republic of Iran.
He was the 14th Governor-general of Kermanshah Province, Iran from November 2013 to September 2015 in the Cabinet of Hassan Rouhani. and first Governor-general of South Khorasan Province in 2nd Cabinet Mohammad Khatami.

References

External links

 Official personal website

Living people
1955 births
University of Tabriz alumni
Iranian governors
People from Abadan, Iran
Islamic Iran Participation Front politicians
Governors of South Khorasan Province